The graceful chameleon (Chamaeleo gracilis) is a species of chameleon native to sub-Saharan Africa. It is commonly around a foot (30.5 cm) long. Because of its abundance, it is heavily exploited by the pet trade.

Geographic range
The graceful chameleon inhabits much of sub-Saharan Africa, from Senegal in the west to Angola in the south and Ethiopia in the east. It mostly lives in forests, though it tolerates bushy areas near plantations and savanna.

Description
C. gracilis is often green, yellow, or brown, with a green stripe on its side. Although it is usually a foot (30.5 cm) in total length (including tail), it can grow up to 15 inches (38 cm) in total length.

Behavior
The graceful chameleon is diurnal; it hunts for prey during the morning and evening, while it rests in the shade during the hottest part of the day. Males are very territorial, and often threaten each other with colorful displays. It eats insects, and can live up to 10 years in captivity.

Reproduction
C. gracilis breeds twice per year, once in the dry season and again at the end of the wet season. 20 to 50 eggs are laid per clutch.

Subspecies
Two subspecies are recognized as being valid, including the nominotypical subspecies.
Chamaeleo gracilis etiennei 
Chamaeleo gracilis gracilis

Etymology
The subspecific name, etiennei, is in honor of Belgian physician and entomologist "Dr. Etienne" who assisted the Congo Expedition of the American Museum of Natural History.

References

Further reading
Hallowell E (1844). "Description of a new species of Chameleon from Western Africa". Proceedings of the Academy of Natural Sciences of Philadelphia 1841: 111–115. (Chamæleo gracilis, new species).

Chamaeleo
Reptiles described in 1844
Reptiles of Uganda
Lizards of Africa
Taxa named by Edward Hallowell (herpetologist)